The 1983 NCAA Women's Division I Swimming and Diving Championships were contested at the second annual NCAA-sanctioned swim meet to determine the team and individual national champions of Division I women's collegiate swimming and diving in the United States. This year's event was hosted at the Bob Devaney Sports Center at the University of Nebraska in Lincoln, Nebraska. The men's and women's titles would not be held at the same site until 2006.

Stanford topped defending champions Florida by 29 points in the team standings, capturing the Cardinal's first team title.

Team standings
Note: Top 10 only
(H) = Hosts
(DC) = Defending champions
Full results

See also
List of college swimming and diving teams

References

NCAA Division I Swimming And Diving Championships
NCAA Division I Swimming And Diving Championships
NCAA Division I Women's Swimming and Diving Championships